The Cigar Bowl was a post-season college football bowl game held in Tampa, Florida, featuring small college teams. The nine editions of the bowl were held from January 1947 (following the 1946 season) through December 1954 (following the 1954 season).

History
The Cigar Bowl was played at Phillips Field, which was located across the Hillsborough River from downtown Tampa at the current site of Tampa Preparatory School and Julian Lane Riverfront Park. The bowl's name was inspired by the local cigar industry, which had been a major factor in Tampa's growth around the turn of the 20th century.

The Cigar Bowl marked the first bowl appearances for the Florida State Seminoles (following the 1949 season) and the Tampa Spartans (following the 1952 season). Three editions of the bowl were played in December (1951, 1952, 1954), while the rest were played in January. In some years, the game was part of a month-long "sports circus" in Tampa, with college basketball, golf, and tennis tournaments scheduled around the area along with horse racing and boxing.

The Cigar Bowl itself was sponsored by the local Egypt Temple Shrine as a fundraising event. After a few years, the limited capacity of Phillips Field (20,000 with temporary bleachers) and the rising cost of hosting the contest caused the organization to rethink its sponsorship. The Shriners discontinued support in 1955, and the bowl folded. There were several attempts to revive the game as a major bowl in subsequent years, but the lack of a larger venue—Tampa Stadium did not open until November 1967—made drawing top college teams impossible. Tampa next hosted a college bowl game in 1986, when the Hall of Fame Bowl (later renamed the Outback Bowl) relocated from Birmingham, Alabama.

Game results

See also
List of college bowl games

References

Defunct college football bowls
American football competitions in Tampa, Florida
College football bowls in Florida
1947 establishments in Florida
1954 disestablishments in Florida
Recurring sporting events established in 1947
Recurring sporting events disestablished in 1954
1940s in Florida
1950s in Florida
20th century in Tampa, Florida